Hypolytrum nemorum is a species of plant in the family Cyperaceae.Seen in Indo-Malesia to Fiji and China.

Description 
It is and erect rhizomatous perennial plant growing up to 60-110 cm with wood rhizome. Flowering throughout the year, the terminal inflorescences is corymbose-panicle.

References 

Cyperaceae
Plants described in 1824